Club 12 de Octubre de Santo Domingo is a Paraguayan football club from the Santo Domingo barrio in Asunción. It was founded in 1922.

History

Copa Paraguay
In 2018, the club was excluded from the year's Copa Paraguay tournament. On 30 May 2019, the club was defeated 3–0 in the Copa Paraguay against 12 de Octubre de Itaguá. On 11 August 2021, the club lost 2–1 against Rubio Ñú in the 2021 tournament.

References

External links
 Soccerway profile

12 De Octubre Club
12 De Octubre Club
1922 establishments in Paraguay